Zambia competed at the 1980 Summer Olympics in Moscow, USSR.  The nation returned to the Olympic Games after boycotting the 1976 Summer Olympics.

Athletics

Men
Track & road events

Field events

Boxing

Men

Football

Men

First round

Group A

Team Roster
 Mirade Mwape
 Milton Muke
 Kaiser Kalambo
 Dickson Makwaza
 Kampela Katumba
 Evans Katebe
 Moses Simwala
 Clement Banda
 Alex Chola
 Godfrey Chitalu
 Pele Kaimana
 Fredrick Kashimoto
 Bernard Mutale
 Moffat Sinkala
 Stanley Tembo
 Ghost Mulenga

Judo

Men

References
Official Olympic Reports

Nations at the 1980 Summer Olympics
1980
Olympics